Pingtung County legislative districts consist of 2 single-member constituencies, each represented by a member of the Republic of China Legislative Yuan. From the 2020 legislative election onwards, the number of Pingtung's seats was decreased from 3 to 2. The redistricting split the original Pingtung Constituency 2 among the two remaining constituencies.

Current districts

Pingtung County Constituency 1 - Ligang, Gaoshu, Sandimen, Wutai, Jiuru, Yanpu, Changzhi, Neipu, Majia, Linluo Townships, Pingtung City
Pingtung County Constituency 2 - Wandan, Taiwu, Zhutian, Wanluan, Chaozhou, Xinyuan, Kanding, Nanzhou, Xinpi, Laiyi, Donggang, Linbian, Jiadong, Fangliao, Chunri, Fangshan, Shizi, Mudan, Checheng, Manzhou, Hengchun, Liuqiu Townships

Historical districts

2008-2020
Pingtung County Constituency 1 - Ligang, Gaoshu, Sandimen, Wutai, Jiuru, Yanpu, Changzhi, Neipu, Majia, Taiwu, Zhutian, Wanluan, Chaozhou Townships
Pingtung County Constituency 2 - Pingtung City, Linluo, Wandan Townships
Pingtung County Constituency 3 - Xinyuan, Kanding, Nanzhou, Xinpi, Laiyi, Donggang, Linbian, Jiadong, Fangliao, Chunri, Fangshan, Shizi, Mudan, Checheng, Manzhou, Hengchun, Liuqiu Townships

Legislators

 Pan Men-an resigned in 2014 after elected Pingtung County magistrate.

 Su Chen-ching is a member of DPP but ran as an independent.

Election results

2020

2016

References

Constituencies in Taiwan
Pingtung County